Hajji Balkhan (also Romanized as Ḩājjī Balkhān, Ḩājjī Belkhān, and Haji Balkhan; also known as Bālā Khān Ḩājjī) is a village in Fajr Rural District, in the Central District of Gonbad-e Qabus County, Golestan Province, Iran. As of the 2006 census, its population was 1,552 in 329 families.

References 

Populated places in Gonbad-e Kavus County